Home is the third studio album by English boy band Collabro. It was released on 3 March 2017 by Peak Productions. The album peaked at number seven on the UK Albums Chart.

Background
It was the Collabro's first album following the departure of Richard Hadfield from the band. They announced their third album would be released in March 2017 having set up their own record label Peak Productions after being dropped by Syco Music. In an interview on Lorraine the band talked about the album and releasing it on their own, "We've had a bit of a break, gone away and we feel that this album we've come back with is our best one yet. It has been brilliant, there's been so much freedom, we've had full artistic control. This is the first album we've done which reflects what we did on BGT which was musical theatre. We've included all the song son Les Mis, Wicked, Funny Girl and Collabro-fied them."

Singles
"Lighthouse" was released as the lead single from the album on 22 September 2017. All proceeds from the song were donated to Save the Children.

Commercial performance
On 6 March 2017 the album was at number seven on the Official Chart Update. On 10 March 2017, Home entered the UK Albums Chart at number seven, making it the bands third top ten album in the UK. The album dropped to number fifty-seven the following week.

Track listing

Charts

Release history

References

2017 albums
Collabro albums